The 2011 UCI Cyclo-cross World Championships took place in Sankt Wendel, Germany on the weekend of January 29 and 30, 2011. As in the previous years, four events were scheduled.

A lap on the track is 2.8 km long with 40% uphill, 25% descents, 35% plain, including some steps and some obstacles. 85% of the track is natural underground, the rest being asphalt.

Schedule

 Saturday, 29 January 2011:
 11h00 Men's Junior
 14h00 Men's Under-23
 Sunday, 30 January 2011:
 11h00 Women's Elite
 14h00 Men's Elite

Medal table

Medal summary

Notes

External links

 Men's Elite Results, UCI.

 
Uci Cyclo-cross World Championships, 2011
Cyclo-cross
UCI Cyclo-cross World Championships
International cycle races hosted by Germany
January 2011 sports events in Germany